The 2001 season was the New Orleans Saints' 35th in the National Football League and their 26th playing home games at the Louisiana Superdome. The Saints failed to improve on their 10–6 record and NFC West division championship from 2000 and finished 7–9, thus missing the playoffs for the eighth time in the past nine seasons. 

The Saints were outscored 160–52 in their final four games, including losses of 40–10 and 38–0 in their last two games, against Washington and San Francisco.

Offseason

NFL draft

Personnel

Staff

Roster

Regular season

Schedule

Standings

References

External links
2001 New Orleans Saints on Pro-Football-Reference.com

New Orleans Saints
New Orleans Saints seasons
New